Cornucopia Peak is a mountain summit located in Baker County, Oregon, US.

Description

Cornucopia Peak is located in the southern Wallowa Mountains and is set along the boundary of the Eagle Cap Wilderness on land managed by Wallowa–Whitman National Forest. The  peak ranks as the 87th-highest mountain in Oregon. The peak is situated immediately west-northwest of ghost town Cornucopia and 14 miles northwest of Halfway, Oregon. Precipitation runoff from the mountain drains to the Snake River via Pine Creek.

History
This landform's toponym has been officially adopted by the United States Board on Geographic Names. The peak is named in association with the gold mining boomtown of Cornucopia which became active in the late 1800s. The Cornucopia mines on the peak's east slope were ranked number one of lode mines in Oregon. A fire lookout was built on the summit in 1924, but no longer exists having been removed long ago. Cornucopia Peak is an attractive backcountry ski destination in winter, but in 2014 a guided tour of eight skiers was caught in an avalanche resulting in two fatalities and two others severely injured.

Climate

Based on the Köppen climate classification, Cornucopia Peak is located in a subarctic climate zone characterized by long, usually very cold winters, and mild summers. Winter temperatures can drop below −10 °F with wind chill factors below −20 °F. Most precipitation in the area is caused by orographic lift. Thunderstorms are common in the summer.

See also
 List of mountain peaks of Oregon

References

External links

 Weather forecast: Cornucopia Peak
 Cornucopia Peak (photo): Flickr

Mountains of Oregon
Landforms of Baker County, Oregon
North American 2000 m summits
Wallowa–Whitman National Forest